Daniel Wang may refer to:

Daniel I.C. Wang (born 1936), Chinese-born professor of chemical engineering at the Massachusetts Institute of Technology
Qingde Wang, Chinese-born professor of astronomy at the University of Massachusetts Amherst